Tale of the Rally is a 2014 Chinese animated family comedy film directed by Zheng Chongxin. It was released on September 6, 2014.

Voice cast
Zhang Lin
Yan Yanzi
Li Tuan
Zu Qing
Liu Hongyun
Deng Yuting
Zhao Na
Gao Quansheng

Box office
The film has earned US$1.46 million at the Chinese box office.

References

2014 comedy films
Animated comedy films
Chinese animated films